Lowell Regio  is a region on the dwarf planet Pluto. It was discovered by the New Horizons spacecraft in 2015. The region corresponds to the Plutonian northern polar cap. It is named after Percival Lowell who established the observatory where Clyde Tombaugh discovered Pluto.

References

2015 in science
Geography of Pluto
Regions
Regions of Pluto
Surface features of Pluto